The Legislative Assembly is the legislative branch of the government of El Salvador.

Structure 

The Salvadoran legislature is a unicameral body. 
It is made up of 84 deputies, all of whom are elected by direct popular vote according to open-list proportional representation to serve three-year terms and are eligible for immediate re-election. Of these, 64 are elected in 14 multi-seat constituencies, corresponding to the country's 14 departments, which return between 3 and 16 deputies each.  The remaining 20 deputies are selected on the basis of a single national constituency.

To be eligible for election to the Assembly, candidates must be (Art. 126, Constitution):
over 25;
Salvadoran citizens by birth, born of at least one parent to be a Salvadorian citizen;
of recognised honesty and education, and
have not had the privilege of one's rights as a citizen cancelled in the previous five years.

Current Standing by Party

XIII legislative composition

Election results

Results

Other parliamentary bodies
El Salvador also returns 20 deputies to the supranational Central American Parliament, also elected according to closed-list proportional representation from a single national constituency.

Members of the Legislative Assembly

See also

Politics of El Salvador
List of legislatures by country
List of presidents of the Legislative Assembly of El Salvador

References

External links
  

El Salvador
Politics of El Salvador
Political organizations based in El Salvador
Government of El Salvador
El Salvador
1824 establishments in El Salvador